Young Tiger (French title: Bébé Tigre)  is a 2014 French drama film directed by Cyprien Vial and starring Harmandeep Palminder.

Cast 

 Harmandeep Palminder as Many 
 Vikram Sharma as Kamal 
 Elisabeth Lando as Elisabeth 
 Bilal Baggad as Sami 
 Billel Brima as Daniel 
 Amandeep Singh as Sony 
 Karim Leklou as Frédéric 
 Aurore Broutin as Patricia
 Gérard Zingg as Gérard
 Marie Berto as the judge
 Navpreet Singh as Ranjit

Accolades

References

External links 
 

2014 films
2014 drama films
2010s French-language films
2010s Punjabi-language films
French drama films
Films about immigration
2014 directorial debut films
2014 multilingual films
French multilingual films
2010s French films